The Ipcress File may refer to:
 The IPCRESS File, spy novel by Len Deighton (1962)
 The Ipcress File (film), British spy film by Sidney J. Furie (1965)
 The Ipcress File (TV series), British spy thriller television series by James Watkins (2022)